= SMOLART =

SMOLART is a Russian agency based in Moscow (Russia), specializing in the international artist management of individual artists, ensembles and projects primarily in the area of classical music and dance (ballet). The agency was founded in 2009 in Moscow, Russia. SMOLART Director is Sergei Molchanov.,

SMOLART is the only Russian agency accepted as a full member to the International Artist Managers' Association (IAMA) (as of 15 November 2012).

== In the focus ==
- opera and ballet projects with leading soloists of Bolshoi, Mariinsky (Kirov) and other famous theatres
- concerts of instrumentalists (pianists, violinists, cellists)
- folk and choral music
- tours of ballet companies

SMOLART offers to its foreign partners complete classical ballets, ballet gala performances, folk dance and songs performances, opera singers, instrumental and classical chamber music concerts.
